Jacqueline Appart (born 5 November 1931) is a Belgian fencer. She competed in the women's individual foil event at the 1960 Summer Olympics.

References

External links
 

1931 births
Possibly living people
Belgian female foil fencers
Olympic fencers of Belgium
Fencers at the 1960 Summer Olympics
Sportspeople from Hainaut (province)